Sayyid Ibraheem Khaleel Al Bukhari (Malayalam: സയ്യിദ് ഇബ്റാഹീം ഖലീല്‍ അല്‍ ബുഖാരി) (Arabic: السيد ابراهيم الخليل البخاري) is founder and chairman of Ma'din Academy and adviser of World Interfaith Harmony Week. He is a sunni Islamic scholar, General Secretary of Kerala Muslim Jamaat, a body of various Muslim organisations in Kerala and he is listed in The Muslim 500.

Early life
Sayyid Bukhari was born in 1964 in a family of scholars in Kadalundi, a village in Kozhikode district, Kerala, India. Bukhari belongs to one of the oldest Muslim families in India, which had migrated from Uzbekistan and settled in the northern part of Kerala. He acquired primary education from his parents especially from his father Sayyid Ahmed Bukhari, the spiritual guide of that region. Under the guidance of Beeran Koya Musliyar, he pursued his higher education and graduated with 2nd rank in Islamic Theology (MFB) from Baqiyat Salihat Arabic College in Tamil Nadu, India.

Immediately after completing his graduation in 1997, he established Ma'din Academy at Swalath Nagar in Malappuram. He has traveled world-wide, lectured to thousands, and composed several works spanning education and contemporary issues. Now in Ma'din under his supervision and spiritual shadow 22,000 students are gaining their education in about 28 institutions ranging from primary to postgraduate level. He is respectfully called Sayyid Bukhari

Positions

 Managing Editor, The Journal Armonia, an international journal for pluralism and holistic education. The vision of Armonia is ‘to help bring together the best of all civilizations and religions in order to apply their common wisdom in promoting the harmonious pursuit of peace, prosperity, and freedom for all persons and communities through compassionate justice’.
 He has been selected one among the 500 most influential Muslims of the world (Muslims 500), published jointly by the Royal Islamic Strategic Studies Centre in Amman, Jordan and Prince Al-Waleed Bin Talal Center for Muslim-Christian Understanding at Georgetown University in the United States, from 2012 -2019.
 Advisor, International Interfaith Harmony Initiative, Malaysia.
 General Secretary, Kerala Muslim Jama’at the umbrella body of various Muslim organizations.
 Vice President of Islamic Educational Board of India, New Delhi. It runs educational institutions all over India and various Asian and African countries like UAE, Saudi Arabia, Oman, Qatar, Bahrain, Malaysia, Singapore, Sri Lanka, Malawi and Tanzania.

International representations

 Global Business and Peace Conference, Seoul in South Korea in 2018.
Active collaborator of G20 Interfaith Forum
 Lead the Indian delegation to the Vatican to attend the Interfaith meetings conducted by  Pontifical Council for Inter religious Dialogue in September 2014.
 Advisor, Interfaith Harmony Seminar and Award Ceremony conducted in Malaysia on 1 March 2012.
 Special Observer in Global Moderates Movement Conference, Kuala Lampur, Malaysia in January 2012.

Achievements

Hosted G20 Interfaith Summit Conference (South Asia)
 He has been leading India's largest Ramadan Peace Conference from 2000 onwards. The conference is held on the 26th day of Ramzan every year. The conference attracts hundreds of thousands of people from various parts of the globe. The main highlight of this conference is Pledge against Terrorism.
 Planned and executed the Knowledge Hunt, an innovative learning programme which takes a group of researchers and scholars to various cultural and religious destinations of the globe. The programme covered China, Malaysia, Indonesia, Brunei, Uzbekistan, Syria, Jordan, Palestine and Egypt.

Meeting 
 Met Narendra Modi, The prime minister of India in 2015 along with a group of scholars following Sufi tradition.

See also
Kanthapuram A. P. Aboobacker Musliyar

References

Further reading 

 An Interview with Sayyid Bukhari:

External links 
 Official Website Sayyid Ibraheem Khaleel Al Bukhari

Indian Sufis
1964 births
Living people
Leaders of Samastha (AP Faction)